Habrodais poodiae is a butterfly in the family Lycaenidae. It was described by John Wesley Brown and David K. Faulkner in 1982. It is found in the Mexican state of Baja California.

Etymology
The specific name is named after Poody Latislaw Brown

References

https://www.floridamuseum.ufl.edu/files/6013/9455/3076/McGuire-AME067.pdf

Butterflies described in 1982
Theclini